Shayne Dahl Lamas (born November 6, 1985) is an American reality television personality and actress. She is known as the winner of the twelfth season of The Bachelor.

Early life
Shayne Lamas was born in Santa Monica, California, the daughter of Lorenzo Lamas and Michele Smith. Her brother is actor AJ Lamas. Her grandparents were Argentine actor Fernando Lamas and American actress Arlene Dahl.

Career
Lamas won season 12 of ABC's The Bachelor, with Matt Grant, who proposed to her on the season finale. Lamas has been in Leave It to Lamas, General Hospital, Air America, The 13th Alley and In The Pines.

Personal life
Lamas was engaged to British bachelor Matt Grant after winning ABC's The Bachelor season 12. Grant proposed to Lamas in the show's season finale. In July 2008, amid rumors of a split, Lamas and Matt Grant announced they were no longer engaged. "We tried hard to make it work but we realized that we were both heading in different directions," the duo said in a statement. "We truly care about each other and will remain close friends."

Lamas went on to marry Nik Richie eight hours after meeting in A Little White Wedding Chapel in Las Vegas, Nevada, on April 18, 2010. Lamas gave birth to their daughter Press Dahl Lamas-Richie on November 11, 2011. Lamas second child, a son named Lyon Lamas-Richie was born via surrogate.

On May 10, 2021, Shayne and Nik announced, via Instagram, that after 11 years of marriage they were getting a divorce.

Filmography
 1999: Air America as Flight attendant (1 episode)
 2003–2005: General Hospital as Emily and Young Caroline Benson (flashbacks)
 2006: Monster Night as Poker babe #1
 2008: The Bachelor: London Calling as herself (contestant)
 2008: The 13th Alley as Ashley
 2009: Deep in the Valley as Candi
 2009: Leave it to Lamas as Herself (all episodes, main cast)
 2010: In The Pines as Maggie
 2012: Couples Therapy as herself

References

External links

 

1985 births
Living people
People from Santa Monica, California
Reality show winners
American television actresses
Actresses from Los Angeles County, California
Bachelor Nation contestants
American people of Argentine descent
American people of Norwegian descent
21st-century American women